Campendoceras is a genus of proterocameroceratids from the Lower Ordovician of  NW Australia and possibly Estonia that can be recognized by its  slender, weakly endogastric, longiconic  and annulate shell and large marginal siphuncle that contains endocones.

The curvature in Campendoceras is less distinct than that in Clitendoceras or Mcqueenoceras and the siphuncle is larger.

References

 Teichert, C, 1964. Proterocameroceratidae, pp 166– 170 in the Treatise on Invertebrate Paleontology Part K. Geol Soc of America and Univ of Kansas Press.

Prehistoric nautiloid genera
Ordovician cephalopods
Prehistoric invertebrates of Oceania
Molluscs of Oceania